George Leech may refer to:
George L. Leech (1890–1985), American prelate of the Roman Catholic Church, Bishop of Harrisburg 1935-1971
George Leech (actor) (1921–2012), British actor and stunt performer